Pirates of the South China Coast were Chinese pirates who were active throughout the South China Sea from the late 18th century to the 19th century, mainly from 1790 to 1810. After 1805, the pirates of the South China Coast entered their most powerful period. Many pirates were fully trained by the Tây Sơn dynasty of Vietnam.

They were called Ladrones by Richard Glasspoole.

History
Since the late 18th century, with the increase of the population, land annexation was becoming serious day by day. Many farmers lost their land, they became brigands or pirates. Giang Bình was known as pirate hotbed at that time.

In early times, most of Chinese pirates were fishmen. They came to Giang Bình by boats to do business, though the private maritime trade was restricted by Chinese government. Giang Bình located near China–Vietnam border; it belonged to Vietnam since Lý dynasty, later, it was ceded to China after the end of the Sino-French War, present-day it was known as Jiangping Town (江平镇, in Dongxing, Fangchenggang, Guangxi, China). Giang Bình was a melting pot of Vietnamese and Chinese, it was a strategically located; however, this area was neglected by Vietnamese government.

Tây Sơn Rebellion broke out in Southern Vietnam in 1771. The rebellion soon swept Nguyễn lords and Trịnh lords out of power. Many Chinese pirates were hired and joined the civil war. Tập Đình and Lý Tài became generals of Tây Sơn army. He Xiwen (Hà Hỉ Văn) became a general of Nguyễn Ánh.

Nguyễn Huệ, one of Tây Sơn leaders, crowned the Quang Trung Emperor, and defeated the invading Chinese army in 1789. After the battle, Huệ reconciled with China, however, he waited for an opportunity to take revenge on China. He provided money to Chinese pirates. Three prominent pirates, Chen Tianbao, Mo Guanfu and Zheng Qi, were ordered to hire more pirates. Since 1790, the number of Chinese pirates grew rapidly. Most of them pledged loyalty to Tây Sơn dynasty, and were fully trained. Many pirates were granted official positions. They were able to block sea routes, and harassed the coastlines of South China (Guangdong, Fujian, Zhejiang, Jiangsu) frequently. Later, they also took part in all important naval battle against Nguyễn Ánh.

In 1801, Nguyễn navy reached Phú Xuân, a naval battle broke out in Nộn estuary (present-day Thuận An estuary). Many Chinese pirates were hired by Tây Sơn to fight against Nguyễn lord. Jean-Baptiste Chaigneau described that it was the fiercest battle in the history of Cochinchina. The battle ended with a near annihilation of both Tây Sơn navy and Chinese pirates. Three important pirates, Mo Guanfu, Liang Wengeng and Fan Wencai, were captured by Nguyễn lord. Emperor Cảnh Thịnh fled to Thăng Long (present-day Hanoi), in there, he planned a counter-attack. Most of pirates did not supported Tây Sơn dynasty, they fled back to China secretly. Chen Tianbao fled to Guangdong and surrendered to China. Zheng Qi still pledged loyalty to Emperor Cảnh Thịnh. In 1802, he arrived at Thăng Long. He was appointed as Đại Tư Mã ("Grand Marshal") by Cảnh Thịnh. Zheng Qi get involved in the siege of Đồng Hới, but his fleet was defeated in the mouth of Nhật Lệ River.

Tây Sơn dynasty was overthrown by Nguyễn dynasty. Unlike Tây Sơn emperors, the new crowned Gia Long started to suppress the pirates. In September 1802, Nguyễn army destroyed the pirates' lair in Giang Bình, captured Zheng Qi and had him executed. 

After this incident, Chinese pirates had to flee to Guangdong. To compete for turf, they attacked each other. Finally, they found it would just destroy themselves. In 1805, seven pirate leaders made an agreement, a pirate alliance was founded. Seven leaders were: Zheng Yi (Red Flag Fleet), Guo Podai (Black Flag Fleet), Liang Bao (White Flag Fleet), Jin Guyang (Green Flag Fleet), Wu Shi'er (Blue Flag Fleet), Wu Zhiqing (Yellow Flag Fleet) and Zheng Laotong. Not long after, Zheng Laotong surrendered to Chinese government, actually there were six gangs joined the alliance. The Red Flag Fleet led by Zheng Yi was the strongest gang in the alliance, as a matter of course, he was selected the leader of the alliance. Ladrones Islands (present-day Wanshan Archipelago), Hong Kong and Leizhou Peninsula became pirate hotbeds.

Zheng Yi died suddenly in Vietnam on 16 November 1807. His widow Ching Shih, became new leaders of Red Flag Fleet. Later, Ching Shih married with adoptive son Cheung Po Tsai, Cheung succeeded the leaders and leader of the alliance. It made Guo Podai resentful.

Now Red Flag Fleet had 30,000 men and several hundred vessels, it became a big threat to Qing China and Portuguese Macau. In September 1809, Cheung was attacked by Portuguese Navy in the Tiger's Mouth. In November, Cheung was besieged by Chinese-Portuguese Navy in Chek Lap Kok. Cheung asked for Guo Podai's help, however, Guo refused. In a day of fog, Cheung fled from the battlefield. He was furious at Guo and vowed revenge on him. A navy battle between Red Flag Fleet and Chinese navy broke out in December, in the battle, Cheung was ambushed by Guo's Black Flag Fleet, and defeated. Several vessels of Cheung were captured by Guo. After the battle, Guo surrendered to Chinese government, Guo became an official of Chinese navy.

Hearing the news, Cheung refused to surrender. However, more and more pirates surrendered. In January 1810, Cheung was persuaded to surrender. He delivered his fleet and weapons on 20 April. Cheung became a Chinese naval officer. On 24 May, Chinese-Vietnamese navy were dispatched to suppress the remnants of pirates. Cheung and Guo took part in the battle. The main part of pirate fleet was destroyed in the battle. It marked the end of Chinese pirates' era.

On 26 June, 1857, Chinese pirates defeated the Portuguese in the Ningpo massacre.

Battles
Battle of Tunmen (April or May 1521) - battle between Ming China and Portugal, Chinese victory
Battle of Sincouwaan (1522) - battle between Ming China and Portugal, Chinese victory
Ningbo Massacre (1542) - battle between Ming China and Portugal, Chinese victory
Ningpo massacre (26 June 1857) - battle between Chinese pirates and Portugal during the Qing dynasty, Chinese victory

Prominent pirates
Chen Tien-pao
Mo Kuan-fu
Cheng Chi
Liang Wen-keng
Fan Wen-tsai
Ho Hsi-wen
Lun Kuei-li
Zheng Yi (pirate)
Zheng Yi Sao
Cheung Po Tsai
Shap-ng-tsai
Ah Pak

See also
Piracy in the Strait of Malacca
Thalassocracy

References

Piracy in the South China Sea
Chinese pirates
18th-century pirates
19th-century pirates
China–Vietnam relations